The Trophée des Alpilles is a professional tennis tournament played on outdoor hard courts. It is currently part of the ATP Challenger Tour. It is held annually at the Tennis Club de Saint-Rémy-de-Provence in Saint-Rémy-de-Provence, France, since 2009.

History
The creation of an ATP Challenger Tour event in the Provence region had been envisioned for several years by several tennis tournaments organisers, as well as former World No. 4, Marseille-born Sébastien Grosjean, before the project came to life during 2008 and 2009 when the Saint-Rémy-de-Provence organisers, sponsored by Grosjean, met with the Association of Tennis Professionals (ATP) to discuss the introduction of such an event in the calendar.

The €42,500 tournament was set in the time slot of the second week of the US Open in September, to allow players eliminated in the qualifications or in the early rounds to compete in Saint-Rémy-de-Provence. As a follow-up to the US Open, the event uses the same tennis balls, and outdoor hard courts similar to the ones of the American Grand Slam. For the 2009 inaugural edition, the line up, attracted with the help of Grosjean, included Top 100 players Björn Phau and Adrian Mannarino or former Wimbledon semifinalists Marcos Baghdatis and Xavier Malisse, who both reached the singles final, in which Baghdatis eventually won his second title on the 2009 ATP Challenger Tour.

Past finals

Singles

Doubles

References

External links
Official website
ITF search

 
ATP Challenger Tour
Hard court tennis tournaments
Tennis tournaments in France